The 2022 FIBA Women's Basketball World Cup Qualifying Tournament determined the last ten teams for the 2022 FIBA Women's Basketball World Cup. It was held from 10 to 14 February 2022.

Format
Sixteen teams, qualified from their respective continental championships, were divided into four groups of four teams each. The top three teams from each group qualified for the final tournament. Two already qualified teams, hosts Australia, and the 2020 Olympic gold medalists United States, participated in this tournament as well, therefore two teams qualified in the groups containing these teams.

Qualified teams

Draw
The draw for the qualifying tournament took place on 23 November 2021.

On 18 November 2021, it was announced that Belgrade would host two tournaments, while Osaka and Washington hosted the other tournaments.

Seeding
The seeding was based on the FIBA Women's World Ranking of August 9, 2021.

Tournaments
Group A and B were played in Belgrade, Serbia, Group C in Osaka, Japan and Group D in Washington, United States.

Tournament A

All times are local (UTC+1).

Tournament B

All times are local (UTC+1).

Tournament C

All times are local (UTC+9).

Tournament D

Time in Washington are (UTC−5) and times in Santo Domingo are (UTC−4).

References

External links
Official website
Tournament summary (Belgrade)
Tournament summary (Osaka)
Tournament summary (Washington)

World Cup Q
Qualifying
FIBA
FIBA
FIBA
FIBA
FIBA
FIBA